Tommy Brown may refer to:

Arts and entertainment
 Tommy Brown (singer) (1931–2016), American R&B singer
 Tommy Brown (record producer) (born 1986), American music producer and songwriter
 Tommy Brown (musician), drummer with Nero and the Gladiators and songwriter

Sports
 Tommy Brown (footballer, born 1896) (1896–1973), Scottish footballer (Brighton, Cardiff, Bristol City, South Shields, Luton)
 Tommy Brown (footballer, born 1897), English footballer (Bradford Park Avenue)
 Tommy Brown (footballer, born 1906), English footballer (Fulham, York City)
 Tommy Brown (footballer, born 1921) (1921–1966), Scottish footballer (Hearts, Millwall, Charlton, Leyton Orient)
 Tommy Brown (baseball) (born 1927), American Major League Baseball player

Others
 Tommy Brown (NAAFI assistant) (1926–1945), English recipient of the George Medal for helping to break the German Enigma code

See also
 Thomas Brown (disambiguation)
 Tom Brown (disambiguation)
 Tommie Brown (born  1934), American politician from Tennessee